is a Japanese mixed martial artist who competes in the lightweight division.

Mixed martial arts career

Shooto
Kume started his professional career in 2007. He fought mainly for Shooto, but also fought for Pancrase and Heat early in his career.

Kume faced Takuya Sato on December 13, 2008 at Shooto: The Rookie Tournament 2008 Final. While the fight was officially ruled a draw (19–19, 19–19, 19–19), Kume lost an extra round (10–9, 10–9, 10–9) and Sato was crowned the 2008 Shooto 167-pound rookie champion.

Kume faced Yoichiro Sato on August 7, 2010 at Shooto: Gig Tokyo 5 for the Shooto Pacific Rim 167-pound title. He lost via unanimous decision after three rounds.

Kume faced UFC veteran Shane Nelson on February 12, 2012 at Shooto: Gig Central 24 – Love and Courage. He won via submission due to a rear-naked choke in the second round.

In 2012, Kume signed with ROAD FC to compete in the lightweight tournament.

Road Fighting Championship
Kume faced Chang Hyun Kim on September 15, 2012 at Road FC 9: Beatdown in the lightweight tournament quarterfinal. He won via submission due to a rear-naked choke in the first round.

In the semifinal on November 24, 2012 at Road FC 10: Monson vs. Kang, Kume faced Chul Yoon. Once again he won via submission due to a rear-naked choke in round one.

In the final on April 13, 2013 at Road FC 11, Kume faced Yui Chul Nam. The fight went to an extra (fourth) round after the judges were unable to decide a winner. Kume lost the extra round via unanimous decision and Nam became the first-ever Road FC lightweight champion.

Kume was given an immediate rematch with Nam for the title on October 12, 2013 at Road FC 13. He lost via unanimous decision after three rounds.

Pancrase 
On April 24, 2016, he fought against Eiji Ishikawa, who was ranked 9th in the lightweight ranking, at PANCRASE 277, which was the first bout in about a year since he underwent surgery for retinal detachment . He won the 2-1 split decision.

On September 11, 2016, he fought against the champion Kazuki Tokudome in the PANCRASE 280 Lightweight King of Pancrase title match . After overwhelming Tokudome with a stand hit from 1R, he finally won the TKO with a pound and succeeded in winning the title.

On December 10, 2017, he rematched with Kazuki Tokudome, who ranked first in the lightweight ranking, in the PANCRASE 292 Lightweight King of Pancrase title match. 81 seconds after the start of the bout, he won a KO with a left hook and succeeded in defending for the first time .

Kume fought against former UFC fighter Anton Kuivanen at PANCRASE 297 on July 1, 2018 . He received a punch just before the end of 2R and suffered the first knockout loss in his career.

Kume was scheduled to rematch Anton Kuivanen for the lightweight King of Pancrase title match on 2019 April 14 at PANCRASE 304. However, Kuivanen ruptured his left biceps, leading him to be replaced by HEAT lightweight champion Tom Santos. In 3R, he won a very single triangle choke from the mount position and succeeded in defending for the second time.

On October 13, 2019 at ONE Championship: Century Part 2 Pancrase x Shooto battle, Kume fought against Shooto champion Mitsufumi Matsumoto . He took advantage of the ground control in the 1st and 3rd rounds, and won the 3-0 decision .

On December 12, 2021, he played against the provisional champion, Tatsuya Saiga, in the PANCRASE 325 Lightweight King of Pancrase Championships. In the first round, he was knocked down by the right uppercut counter, but in the 2nd round, he won a come-from-behind victory by armbar, and succeeded in defending the title and unifying the title for the third time.

Rizin
On September 27, 2020, he played against Satoru Kitaoka in Rizin 24 , which was his first participation in RIZIN , and won a 2-1 decision .

Kume faced top Japanese lightweight prospect Koji Takeda at Rizin 27 on March 21, 2021. In an action packed bout, Kume lost the bout via unanimous decision.

Championships and accomplishments

Mixed martial arts
Road Fighting Championship
Road FC lightweight tournament finalist
Pancrase
 Pancrase Lightweight Championship (one time, current)

Mixed martial arts record

|-
|Win
|align=center|25–6–4
|Tatsuya Saika
|Submission (armbar)
|Pancrase 325
|
|align=center|2
|align=center|2:28
|Tokyo, Japan
|
|-
|Loss
|align=center|24–6–4
|Koji Takeda
|Decision (unanimous)
|Rizin 27
|
|align=center|3
|align=center|5:00
|Nagoya, Japan
|
|-
|Win
|align=center|24–5–4
|Satoru Kitaoka
|Decision (split)
|Rizin 24
|
|align=center|3
|align=center|5:00
|Saitama, Japan
|
|-
| Win
| align=center|23–5–4
| Koshi Matsumoto
| Decision (unanimous)
| ONE Championship: Century Part 2
| 
| align=center|3
| align=center|5:00
| Tokyo, Japan
| 
|-
| Win
| align=center|22–5–4
| Tom Santos
| Submission (triangle choke)
| Pancrase 304
| 
| align=center|3
| align=center|1:08
| Tokyo, Japan
| 
|-
| Loss
| align=center|21–5–4
| Anton Kuivanen
| TKO (punches)
| Pancrase 297
| 
| align=center|2
| align=center|4:56
| Tokyo, Japan
| 
|-
| Win
| align=center| 21–4–4
| Kazuki Tokudome
| KO (punch)
|  Pancrase 292
| 
| align=center|1
| align=center|1:21
| Tokyo, Japan
| 
|-
| Win
| align=center| 20–4–4
| Matija Blazicevic
| Submission (rear-naked choke)
|  Pancrase 286
| 
| align=center|2
| align=center|1:05
| Tokyo, Japan
|
|-
| Win
| align=center| 19–4–4
| Kazuki Tokudome
| TKO (ground & pound)
|  Pancrase 280
| 
| align=center|1
| align=center|4:45
| Tokyo, Japan
| 
|-
| Win
| align=center| 18–4–4
| Eiji Ishikawa
| Decision (split)
|  Pancrase 277
| 
| align=center|3
| align=center|5:00
| Tokyo, Japan
|
|-
| Win
| align=center| 17–4–4
| Taisuke Okuno
| Decision (unanimous)
|  Pancrase 266
| 
| align=center|3
| align=center|5:00
| Tokyo, Japan
| 
|-
| Loss
| align=center| 16–4–4
| A Sol Kwon
| Decision (majority)
| Road FC 17
| 
| align=center| 3
| align=center| 5:00
| Seoul, South Korea
| 
|-
| Win
| align=center| 16–3–4
| Eduardo Simoes
| Decision (unanimous)
| Road FC 14
| 
| align=center| 3
| align=center| 5:00
| Seoul, South Korea
| 
|-
| Loss
| align=center| 15–3–4
| Yui Chul Nam
| Decision (unanimous)
| Road FC 13
| 
| align=center| 3
| align=center| 5:00
| Gumi, South Korea
| 
|-
| Loss
| align=center| 15–2–4
| Yui Chul Nam
| Decision (unanimous)
| Road FC 11
| 
| align=center| 4
| align=center| 5:00
| Seoul, South Korea
| 
|-
| Win
| align=center| 15–1–4
| Chul Yoon
| Submission (rear-naked choke)
| Road FC 10: Monson vs. Kang
| 
| align=center| 1
| align=center| 2:19
| Busan, South Korea
| 
|-
| Win
| align=center| 14–1–4
| Chang Hyun Kim
| Submission (rear-naked choke)
| Road FC 9: Beatdown
| 
| align=center| 1
| align=center| 3:27
| Wonju, South Korea
| 
|-
| Win
| align=center| 13–1–4
| Koji Nakamura
| Submission (triangle choke)
|  Pancrase: Progress Tour 7
| 
| align=center| 2
| align=center| 1:58
| Tokyo, Japan
| 
|-
| Win
| align=center| 12–1–4
| Hyung Seok Lee
| Submission (armbar)
| Road FC 7: Recharged
| 
| align=center| 2
| align=center| 0:54
| Seoul, South Korea
| 
|-
| Win
| align=center| 11–1–4
| Shane Nelson
| Submission (rear-naked choke)
| Shooto: Gig Central 24 – Love and Courage
| 
| align=center| 2
| align=center| 1:54
| Nagoya, Aichi, Japan
| 
|-
| Win
| align=center| 10–1–4
| Daisuke Hanazawa
| Submission (rear-naked choke)
| Pancrase: Impressive Tour 12
| 
| align=center| 3
| align=center| 4:01
| Osaka, Japan
| 
|-
| Win
| align=center| 9–1–4
| Masahiro Toryu
| Submission (rear-naked choke)
| Pancrase: Impressive Tour 7
| 
| align=center| 1
| align=center| 1:44
| Osaka, Japan
| 
|-
| Win
| align=center| 8–1–4
| Jung Min Kang
| Submission (kimura)
| Shooto: Gig Central 22
| 
| align=center| 2
| align=center| 1:23
| Nagoya, Aichi, Japan
| 
|-
| Win
| align=center| 7–1–4
| Daniel Digby
| Submission (rear-naked choke)
| Shooto: Shooto the Shoot 2011
| 
| align=center| 1
| align=center| 4:13
| Joondalup, Australia
| 
|-
| Loss
| align=center| 6–1–4
| Yoichiro Sato
| Decision (unanimous)
| Shooto: Gig Tokyo 5
| 
| align=center| 3
| align=center| 5:00
| Tokyo, Japan
| 
|-
| Win
| align=center| 6–0–4
| Akihiro Yamazaki
| Decision (unanimous)
| Shooto: Gig Central 20
| 
| align=center| 3
| align=center| 5:00
| Nagoya, Aichi, Japan
| 
|-
| Win
| align=center| 5–0–4
| Kenta Takagi
| Decision (unanimous)
| Shooto: Gig Central 19
| 
| align=center| 2
| align=center| 5:00
| Nagoya, Aichi, Japan
| 
|-
| Draw
| align=center| 4–0–4
| Taisuke Okuno
| Draw
| Shooto: Gig Central 18
| 
| align=center| 2
| align=center| 5:00
| Nagoya, Aichi, Japan
| 
|-
| Win
| align=center| 4–0–3
| Hirosumi Sugiura
| Decision (split)
| Shooto: Gig Central 17
| 
| align=center| 2
| align=center| 5:00
| Nagoya, Aichi, Japan
| 
|-
| Draw
| align=center| 3–0–3
| Takuya Sato
| Draw
| Shooto: The Rookie Tournament 2008 Final
| 
| align=center| 2
| align=center| 5:00
| Tokyo, Japan
| 
|-
| Draw
| align=center| 3–0–2
| Yoichiro Sato
| Draw
| Shooto: Gig Central 15
| 
| align=center| 2
| align=center| 5:00
| Nagoya, Aichi, Japan
| 
|-
| Win
| align=center| 3–0–1
| Yoshifumi Dogaki
| TKO (doctor stoppage)
| Shooto: Gig Central 14
| 
| align=center| 1
| align=center| 3:38
| Nagoya, Aichi, Japan
| 
|-
| Win
| align=center| 2–0–1
| Takuya Sato
| Submission (rear-naked choke)
| Shooto: Gig Central 13
| 
| align=center| 1
| align=center| 1:11
| Nagoya, Aichi, Japan
| 
|-
| Win
| align=center| 1–0–1
| Yasushi Tsujimoto
| Submission (rear-naked choke)
| Heat 4
| 
| align=center| 2
| align=center| 3:07
| Nagoya, Aichi, Japan
| 
|-
| Draw
| align=center| 0–0–1
| Tomokazu Yuasa
| Draw
| Shooto: Gig Central 12
| 
| align=center| 2
| align=center| 5:00
| Nagoya, Aichi, Japan
|

References

1985 births
Living people
Sportspeople from Nagoya
Japanese male mixed martial artists
Lightweight mixed martial artists
Mixed martial artists utilizing judo
Japanese male judoka
20th-century Japanese people
21st-century Japanese people